Homogenes is a genus of beetles in the family Cerambycidae, containing the following species:

 Homogenes albolineatus (Buquet in Guérin-Méneville, 1844)
 Homogenes leprieurii (Buquet in Guérin-Méneville, 1844)
 Homogenes mimus Napp & dos Santos, 1996
 Homogenes rubrogaster Napp & dos Santos, 1996

References

Heteropsini